A list of American films released in 1994. 
Forrest Gump won the Academy Award for Best Picture.

Top-grossing films (U.S.)

A

B

C

D

E

F

G

H

I

J

K

L

M

N

O

P

Q

R

S

T

U

V

W

X

Y

Z

See also
 1994 in American television
 1994 in the United States

External links

 
 List of 1994 box office number-one films in the United States

1994
Films
Lists of 1994 films by country or language